The 2019 NB Tankard, the provincial men's curling championship of New Brunswick was held January 23 to 27 at Curl Moncton in Moncton, New Brunswick.  The winning Terry Odishaw team represented New Brunswick at the 2019 Tim Hortons Brier in Brandon, Manitoba.

The event was held in conjunction with the 2019 New Brunswick Scotties Tournament of Hearts, the provincial women's curling championship.

Teams
The teams are listed as follows:

Round robin standings

Scores
The schedule is as follows:

January 23
Draw 1
Crouse 8-4 Jones
Grattan 5-4 Cyr
Odishaw 8-1 Vaughan
Dobson 10-4 Comeau

Draw 3
Dobson 8-7 Vaughan
Odishaw 7-5 Comeau
Jones 7-5 Cyr
Grattan 11-2 Crouse

January 24
Draw 4
Odishaw 10-4 Grattan
Cyr 9-2 Vaughan

Draw 5
Odishaw 6-4 Cyr
Grattan 6-4 Vaughan
Dobson 9-4 Crouse
Jones 5-4 Comeau

Draw 6
Comeau 10-4 Crouse
Jones 9-3 Dobson

January 25
Draw 7
Vaughan 8-3 Jones
Odishaw 7-3 Crouse

Draw 8
Jones 9-2 Odishaw
Vaughan 9-2 Crouse
Grattan 9-4 Comeau
Cyr 7-6 Dobson

Draw 9
Grattan 10-0 Dobson
Cyr 9-4 Comeau

January 26
Draw 10
Vaughan 4-3 Comeau
Odishaw 8-3 Dobson
Cyr 12-1 Crouse
Grattan 7-3 Jones

Tiebreaker
Jones 7-6 Cyr

Playoffs

Semifinal 
January 26, 8:00pm

Final 
January 27, 9:00am

References

2019 Tim Hortons Brier
Curling competitions in Moncton
2019 in New Brunswick
NB Tankard